Kwodwo Addae (born 7 September 1995) is a Ghanaian professional footballer who plays as a defender for Ghanaian Premier League side Karela United.

Career 
Addae played for Western Region-based club Karela United in the 2018 Ghanaian Premier League, before moving on loan to Cape Coast Ebusua Dwarfs in June 2018 and returning to Karela in 2019. He featured in 9 league matches in the 2019–20 Ghana Premier League before the league was suspended and later cancelled due to the COVID-19 pandemic.

References

External links 

 

Living people
1995 births
Association football defenders
Ghanaian footballers
Karela United FC players
Ghana Premier League players